Sādeq Chubak (sometimes Sādegh Choubak; August 5, 1916  July 3, 1998), was an Iranian author of short fiction, drama, and novels. His short stories are characterized by their intricacy, economy of detail, and concentration on a single theme, leading some to compare them to Persian miniature paintings. Choubak was a naturalist, and his novels reflected the dark side of society. He was a very close friend of Sadegh Hedayat who was an influential writer at that time.

Biography
Sadeq Chubak was born in Bushehr, where he first studied before moving to Shiraz and then Tehran. For some time he was employed by the Ministry of Education and the Oil Company. Widely considered as the greatest naturalist writer in Persian literature, he has written a large bulk of works including novels, short stories, and plays. The collected stories Puppet Show and The Monkey Whose Master had Died have exercised a profound influence on modern Persian literature.  Chubak died on 3 July 1998, in Berkeley, California, U.S.

Writing

In his works, Chubak studies the lives of the downtrodden people of the society who are victimized by iniquities and natural deterministic forces. Sympathetic to the sorrows and miseries of such people, he offers one single solution, combating corruption and injustice.

His novel Tangsir details the valorous acts of the fighters in Tangestan. It has been translated into many languages. The setting of this story is Davvas (also دواس) inhabited mostly by people migrating from other parts of Bushehr province including Tangestan. Irked by social injustice, the protagonist, Zar Mohammad, takes justice into his own hands and fights social iniquities. Zar Mohammad has earned a considerable sum of money and embarks on trading but he is ripped out of his money by the governor. Bitterly despaired by the delay or absence of justice, he takes a gun and kills his enemies one by one. After the killing of the frauds, he is dubbed Shir Mohammad (lion-hearted Mohammad) by the villagers. The theme of justice and revenge fills the entire ambiance of the novel. Once the law is too slow to mete out justice to the ones who deserve it, anarchy will prevail with the consequence that people will decide their own fate and exercise justice in the light of their own definition of the concept. After long ordeals, Shir Mohammad escapes the grip of the law. Chubak laments the social injustice and the blind ignorance of the lawmakers. The quest for justice turns into a messianic mission for the protagonist who comes to be viewed by other villagers as a man who is tasked with liberating them from the tyrannous hands.

After the publication of The Last Alms and The First Night of the Grave Chubak wrote his novel The Patient Stone which is a great modern novel in Persian literature. This novel details the events in a neighborhood. One of the neighbors called ‘Gohar’ is lost and the characters talk about her from their own point of view. Gohar is the wife of Hajj Ismail the merchant. Since her child has a nosebleed in the shrine, she is accused of adultery and driven out of her home. Now she earns her living on a temporary-basis marriage with different men. The story begins with her loss and ends with the discovery of her body among the victims of Seif al-Qalam, the killer of whores. All the characters of the novel are infernally captivated by their desires and deterministic powers. They are all exposed to threats of death, rape, and violence. The destructive influence of superstitions is clearly discernible in their lives. The novel is divided into 26 sections, each section narrated through free association. The modern form of narration helps the reader to delve into the characters’ minds and gain a deeper understanding of their worlds. By including the plurality of consciousnesses in the story, Chubak illustrates the life of Gohar from different points of view. The story of The Patient Stone is based on the suffering and miseries of the downtrodden people that create a dramatic and complex reality. Polyphony (literature) Gohar is absent in the novel but she constitutes the main talk of the characters. Gohar which literally means jewel can be taken as a symbol for the lost jewel of humanity in the society. Chubak depicts a very brutal world in which people are extremely mortified and they cannot bear the sight of each other.

See also
 Intellectual Movements in Iran
 Persian literature

References

Sources 
 Deborah Miller Mostaghel, "The Second Sadeq: The Short Stories of Iranian Writer Sadeq Chubak," World Literature Today, 53, no. 2 (1979): 227-231
 Jahangir Dorri, "The Satire of Sadeq Chubak," in Critical Perspectives on Modern Persian Literature, ed. Thomas M. Ricks (Washington DC, 1984), 327-328 
 Kinga Markus, "Experiments with the Kunstlerroman in the Modern Persian Fiction: The Patient Stone of Sadeq Chubak and The Night's Journey of Bahman Sholevar", The Journal of Sophia Asian Studies, 3 (1985): 225-239

External links

 F. R. C. Bagley, Sadeq Chubak: An Anthology, (Delmar, 1982)
 
 Liora Hendelman-Baavur, "Grotesque Corporeality and Literary Aesthetics in Sadeq Chubak's The Patient Stone", Iranian Studies, Vol. 47, No. 4 (July 2014):  569-593

1916 births
1998 deaths
Iranian male novelists
Iranian novelists
Iranian male short story writers
People from Bushehr
20th-century novelists
20th-century Iranian short story writers
20th-century male writers
Iranian expatriates in the United States